East Dulwich railway station is in the London Borough of Southwark in East Dulwich, south London. The station was named Champion Hill when it first opened in 1868. It stands where Grove Vale meets Dog Kennel Hill.

Services

All services at East Dulwich are operated by Southern using  EMUs.

The typical off-peak service in trains per hour is:
 4 tph to  via 
 2 tph to  via 
 2 tph to  via 

During the evenings (after approximately 20:00), the service between London Bridge and Beckenham Junction is reduced to hourly. This service does not run on Sundays.

From May 2022 there will be 2 additional services to London Bridge, departing at 08:02 and 08:32 

The station has 2 entrances, one to each platform.  The ticket office is concealed within the entrance to the "down" (southbound) platform.

Connections
London Buses routes 40, 42, 176, 185, 484 and P13 serve the station.

See also
North Dulwich railway station
Oyster card (pay as you go) on National Rail

References

External links

Dulwich
Railway stations in the London Borough of Southwark
Former London, Brighton and South Coast Railway stations
Railway stations in Great Britain opened in 1868
Railway stations served by Govia Thameslink Railway